Dr. Norman A J Berisford (born 1928 in Newcastle-under-Lyme, Staffordshire) is an English architectural designer, university lecturer, artist, author, poet and philanthropist.

He is notable because he was one of the first architectural designers to recognise the importance of psychology and the use of lighting in interior design as published in his paper The Psychological Aspects of Lighting in Interior Design.

He is co-author of A History of Interior Design (1983, Rhodec International University) and The Complete Poetry of Norman AJ Berisford (2016, L.R. Price Publications Ltd).

His water colour paintings have been sold at auction with the proceeds going to the Kemp Hospice charity.

He lives in Worcestershire with his wife Margaret.

References

1928 births
Living people
20th-century English architects
English watercolourists
English poets